Scheuchzer is a surname. Notable people with the surname include:

 Johann Caspar Scheuchzer (1702-1729)
 Johann Gaspar Scheuchzer (1684-1738)
 Johann Jakob Scheuchzer (1672-1733)
 Wilhelm Scheuchzer (1803–1866)

See also 

 Scheuchzeria
 Eriophorum scheuchzeri
 Campanula scheuchzeri
 Scheuchzerhorn